AMG Sebastiani Basket history and statistics in FIBA Europe and EuroLeague Basketball competitions.

European competitions

Record
AMG Sebastiani Basket has overall, from 1974–75 (first participation) to 1982–83 (last participation): 38 wins against 20 defeats in 58 games for all the European club competitions.

 EuroLeague: –
 FIBA Saporta Cup: –
 FIBA Korać Cup: 38–20 (58)

References

Basketball teams in Lazio